The 2020–21 Louisiana Ragin' Cajuns women's basketball team represented the University of Louisiana at Lafayette during the 2020–21 NCAA Division I women's basketball season. The Ragin' Cajuns, led by ninth-year head coach Garry Brodhead, played all home games at the Cajundome along with the Louisiana Ragin' Cajuns men's basketball team. They were members of the Sun Belt Conference.

For the first time ever, the Cajuns women’s basketball team captured the West Division championship as well as the Regular Season championship. Following their loss in the finals of the Conference tournament, the Cajuns were one of nine automatic bids to the WNIT.

Previous season 
The Ragin' Cajuns finished the 2019–20 season 19-12, 10–8 in Sun Belt play to finish in fourth place in the conference. They made it to the 2019-20 Sun Belt Conference women's basketball tournament where the defeated Georgia Southern and Little Rock before all post-season play, including the finale of the Sun Belt Tournament, was cancelled due to the COVID-19 pandemic.

Offseason

Departures

Transfers

Recruiting

Roster

Schedule and results

|-
!colspan=9 style=| Non-conference Regular Season
|-

|-
!colspan=9 style=| Conference Regular Season
|-

|-
!colspan=9 style=| Sun Belt Tournament

|-
!colspan=9 style=| Women's NIT

See also
 2020–21 Louisiana Ragin' Cajuns men's basketball team

References

Louisiana Ragin' Cajuns women's basketball seasons
Louisiana Ragin' Cajuns
Louisiana Ragin' Cajuns women's basketball
Louisiana Ragin' Cajuns women's basketball
Louisiana